Antonio Susini may refer to:
 Antonio Susini (sculptor)
 Antonio Susini (baseball)